There You Are! is a 1926 American silent comedy film directed by Edward Sedgwick. Based on the play of the same name by F. Hugh Herbert, the film starred Conrad Nagel and Edith Roberts. There You Are! is now considered lost.

Plot
George (Conrad Nagel) is a clerk who captures a bandit, and in return gets the boss' daughter (Edith Roberts).

Cast
 Conrad Nagel as George Fenwick 
 Edith Roberts as Joan Randolph 
 George Fawcett as William Randolph 
 Gwen Lee as Anita Grant 
 Eddie Gribbon as Eddie Gibbs 
 Phillips Smalley as J. Bertram Peters 
 Gertrude Bennett as Mrs. Gibbs

References

External links
 
 

1926 films
Silent American comedy films
American silent feature films
American black-and-white films
American films based on plays
Lost American films
Metro-Goldwyn-Mayer films
1926 lost films
1926 comedy films
Films with screenplays by F. Hugh Herbert
Films directed by Edward Sedgwick
1920s American films